(born 9 July 1972) is a retired Japanese sprinter who specialized in the 400 metres.

He finished fifth in 4 × 400 m relay at the 1996 Olympic Games, together with teammates Shunji Karube, Koji Ito and Jun Osakada. He also competed at the World Indoor Championships in 1993 and 1997 and the World Championships in 1993 and 1997 without reaching the final.

Achievements

References

1972 births
Living people
Japanese male sprinters
Athletes (track and field) at the 1996 Summer Olympics
Olympic athletes of Japan
Universiade medalists in athletics (track and field)
Universiade silver medalists for Japan